Lucerne Australian symptomless virus (LASV) is a plant pathogenic virus of the family Comoviridae.

External links
ICTVdB - The Universal Virus Database: Lucerne Australian symptomless virus
Family Groups - The Baltimore Method

Nepoviruses
Viral plant pathogens and diseases